The Axioappendicular muscles are the muscles that extend between the axial and (superior or inferior) appendicular skeletons. There are two groups, the anterior axioappendicular muscles and the posterior axioappendicular muscles.

Anterior axioappendicular muscles

The anterior axioappendicular muscles are the:

 Pectoralis major
 Pectoralis minor
 Subclavius
 Serratus anterior

Posterior axioappendicular muscles

The posterior axioappendicular muscles are described as two sub-groups:

 Superficial Posterior Axioappendicular muscles (or the extrinsic shoulder muscles)
 Trapezius
 Latissimus dorsi
 Deep Posterior Axioappendicular muscles (or the intrinsic shoulder muscles)
 Levator scapulae
 Rhomboid minor
 Rhomboid major

References 

Muscular system